Devin George Edward Walker is an American theoretical particle physicist, best known for his work on dark matter.

Education
Devin Walker received his bachelor's degree in physics from Hampton University, where he studied with physics professor Warren Buck. He studied dark matter as a doctoral student at Harvard University under Nima Arkani-Hamed, culminating in the thesis "Theories on the Origin of Mass and Dark Matter". Walker became the first American-born and American-educated Black physicist to earn a doctorate from the Harvard Physics Department in 2005.

Career
Walker was awarded the prestigious President's Postdoctoral Fellowship at the University of California at Berkeley, during which he worked on a framework to detect electroweak symmetry breaking from generic Large Hadron Collider (LHC) data. He went on to another postdoctoral appointment at Stanford, and a junior professorship at the University of Washington.

Walker is currently a research professor at the Dartmouth Department of Physics and Astronomy.

Awards
 2020 - Moore Prize from the American Physical Society
 2011 - Ford Foundation Fellowship
 2010 - LHC Theory Initiative Fellowship

References

External links
 Faculty webpage of Devin Walker at Dartmouth University
 Devin Walker Personal Website
 Congratulations to Devin Walker from Lubos Motl

Living people
African-American scientists
Year of birth missing (living people)
Particle physicists
American physicists
Hampton University alumni
Harvard Graduate School of Arts and Sciences alumni
21st-century African-American people
African-American physicists